Ljubomir Crnokrak (born 19 March 1958) is a Croatian Serb professional football manager. He was also a fashion model and instructor.

Career
Born in Pristeg, a village in the outskirts of Benkovac, back then part of SR Croatia, he started playing football at a very early age. Most of his friends and neighbors were supporters of Red Star Belgrade. Recognising his talent, DIF professor Veljko Aleksić sent Crnokrak to the capital to join Red Star Belgrade for training. There he was taught by authorities in the field such as Ćiro Blažević, Branko Stanković, Dragoslav Šekularac, Vlada Popović, Ratomir Dujković, and Dragan Džajić. This provided him the ability to attend and participate in UEFA seminars.

However, by that time he was dedicating himself to professional modeling, which provided him with a good income. He also taught younger models. During this time he decided to sacrifice his football career for modeling, but he later returned to football.

He returned to football by coaching lower-level clubs such as Polet Dorćol and Palilulac Beograd and the women's club Sloga Zemun, which he began in 1991. In 1992, he founded his own football academy. In 1995, he returned to his coaching career with Sloga Petrovac na Mlavi, Srem Jakovo and Šumadija Aranđelovac in succession.

Wishing to take on new challenges, in 2004 he moved to the Dominican Republic and from 2005 until 2007 he coached the Dominican Republic national football team. When he started, the team was ranked 193 in FIFA rankings, and by time he left it had risen to 135. He put the team among the top eight CONCACAF teams, but a lack of financial resources stopped the project and Crnokrak left.

Later, he coached FK Hajduk Kula in 2018.

References

1958 births
Living people
People from Benkovac
Serbs of Croatia
Yugoslav football managers
Serbian football managers
Expatriate football managers in the Dominican Republic
Dominican Republic national football team managers
Serbian male models